The Kyongbuk Maeil Shinmun is a Korean-language daily newspaper serving Gyeongsangbuk-do, a province in eastern South Korea.  It is headquartered in the coastal city of Pohang, but has correspondents through the province and the adjoining city of Daegu.  Founded in 1989, it published its first issue in 1990.  The CEO is Kim Gi-ho.  

The Kyongbuk Maeil Shinmun is published 5 days a week, Monday through Friday, with an expanded 24-page Friday edition.

See also
List of newspapers

External links
Official site

Newspapers published in South Korea
North Gyeongsang Province
Mass media in Pohang
Mass media in Daegu